Palazzo Priuli Bon is a Gothic-style palace on the Canal Grande, located between the Palazzo Duodo and the Campo of San Stae, in the sestiere of Santa Croce, in Venice, Italy. 

The palace was built towards the end of the fourteenth century for Lunardo Priuli, who died in 1543. Later on it belonged to the Bon family (formerly of San Canciano). The last of the family with this surname, Lorenzo Bon, died in 1792. In 1796, the members of the Dandolo family resided here. The palace is now used for exhibitions.

References

Houses completed in the 15th century
Priuli Bon
Priuli Bon
Gothic architecture in Venice